Vladimir Aleksandrovich Kanygin (19 September 1948 – 27 April 1990) was a Russian middleweight weightlifter. In 1971 he won a Soviet, a European and a world title.

References

1948 births
1990 deaths
Soviet male weightlifters
Weightlifters at the 1972 Summer Olympics
Olympic weightlifters of the Soviet Union
European Weightlifting Championships medalists
World Weightlifting Championships medalists